VFA may refer to:

US Navy strike fighter squadron
Victorian Football Association, an Australian rules football competition established in the 19th century
Visiting Forces Agreement
Volatile fatty acids
Vaillancourt Folk Art, an American studio producing chalkware collectables.
Veteran Feminists of America, an organization for veterans of the Second Wave of the feminist movement
Veterans For America, an organization
Victoria Falls Airport, Zimbabwe (IATA airport code: VFA)
Valley Football Association, a high school football conference in Wisconsin
Venture for America, a non profit fellowship focused on entrepreneurship
Verband Forschender Arzneimittelhersteller - trade association of the German pharmaceutical industry